Kai Arzheimer (b. 1969) is a German professor of Political Science at the University of Mainz and a visiting Fellow at the Department of Government at the University of Essex. He writes on right-wing extremism and his publications include "Politikverdrossenheit" and "Die Wähler der extremen Rechten 1980 - 2002".

Selected publications
Arzheimer, Kai. “Working Class Parties 2.0? Competition between Centre Left and Extreme Right Parties.” Class Politics and the Radical Right. Ed. Rydren, Jens. London, New York: Routledge, 2012. 75–90.

References

External links
Website

Academics and writers on far-right extremism
Living people
German political scientists
1969 births
People associated with the University of Essex
Academic staff of Johannes Gutenberg University Mainz